Martonosi is a surname. Notable people with the surname include:

 (born 1953), mayor of Maroslele in Hungary
Margaret Martonosi, American computer scientist
Susan Martonosi, American mathematician